The women's 35.6 kilometres individual time trial competition at the 2010 Asian Games was held on 20 November.

Schedule
All times are China Standard Time (UTC+08:00)

Results 
Legend
DNF — Did not finish

References

External links 
Results

Road Women ITT